The upside-down harptail blenny (Meiacanthus abditus) is a species of combtooth blenny found around the Sulu Archipelago in the Philippines.  This species grows to a length of  TL.

References

External links
 

Upside-down harptail blenny
Fish of the Pacific Ocean
Fish described in 1987